Kraš is a surname. Notable people with the surname include:

 Josip Kraš (1900–1941), Croatian communist and People's Hero of Yugoslavia
 Ana Kraš (born 1984), Serbian-American designer and photographer

See also
 Krass (surname)